Rhabdophis callistus, Boettger's keelback, is a keelback snake in the family Colubridae found in Indonesia.

References

Rhabdophis
Reptiles of Sulawesi
Endemic fauna of Indonesia
Reptiles described in 1873
Taxa named by Albert Günther